The Snowplow Game was a regular-season game played between the Miami Dolphins and New England Patriots on December 12, 1982, at Schaefer Stadium in Foxborough, Massachusetts. Due to icy conditions, the game remained scoreless until late in the fourth quarter, when the snowplow operator was called in to clear a spot on the snowy field specifically for New England kicker John Smith so he could kick the game-winning field goal to give the Patriots a 3–0 win.

Overview
The night before this game, heavy rains soaked the AstroTurf surface at New England's Schaefer Stadium in Foxborough, Massachusetts. The field froze over, and conditions were made worse when a snowstorm hit during the game. An emergency ground rule was put into play where the officials could call timeout and allow the ground crew to use a snowplow to clear the yard markers. Despite this rule, the ground crew could not plow often enough to keep the field clear. The teams remained scoreless late into the fourth quarter.

With 4:45 remaining, Patriots head coach Ron Meyer motioned to snowplow operator Mark Henderson to clear a spot on the field for placekicker John Smith. The plow veered left in front of the goal post, giving Smith a clean spot from which to kick. The kick was good.

The Dolphins refused an offer by the head referee to clear the field for their final kick.

As the Dolphins drove down the field for a potential game-tying field goal, Henderson drove the snowplow with them, remaining at the ready for the call from the referee to clear a spot for Dolphins kicker Uwe Von Schamann. On fourth down, however, Shula decided to go for it and failed, effectively securing the game for the Patriots. Linebacker Don Blackmon picked off Dolphins quarterback David Woodley. Miami managed to force the Patriots to punt in time to attempt a Hail Mary pass on the game's final play, which was also intercepted. The Patriots won the game by the final score of 3–0.

The game ball was awarded to all-pro linebacker Steve Nelson, who subsequently donated it to his alma mater, North Dakota State University. Henderson also received a game ball from a grateful Meyer after the game.

Dolphins head coach Don Shula, angry with the move and believing it to be against the league rules, pointed out that the league's unfair act clause allowed the league to overturn the game result. He met with NFL commissioner Pete Rozelle several days later concerning his protest, and although Rozelle agreed with Shula that the use of the plow gave the Patriots an unfair advantage, he said that he had never reversed the result of a game and was not going to start doing so for any reason, especially since without a rule explicitly barring such use of the plow, the act wasn't illegal.

Officials 
Referee: Bob Frederic (#71)
Umpire: John Keck (#67)
Head Linesman: Jerry Bergman (#17)
Line Judge: Bob Beeks (#59)
Back Judge: Bill Swanson (#38)
Side Judge: Gary Lane (#120)
Field Judge: Don Hakes (#96)

Aftermath and legacy
The snowplow operator Mark Henderson, a convict on work release, jokingly remarked, "What are they gonna do, throw me in jail?"

Both teams would make the playoffs, with the Patriots finishing 7th in the AFC, and the Dolphins finishing 2nd (the normal division-oriented playoff format was scrapped that year due to the player's strike that shortened the 1982 season in favor of an expanded Super Bowl Tournament), but the Dolphins would exact revenge, eliminating the Patriots by a score of 28–13 in the First Round, en route to the Dolphins' reaching Super Bowl XVII.

The following year, the NFL banned the use of snowplows on the field during a game. Until , teams were given a sideline warning on the first offense if a non-player attempted to clear the playing field before being penalized, a situation that came up during the 2017 Indianapolis–Buffalo contest played in a heavy snowstorm. In 2018, the rule was changed to immediately penalize a team attempting to do so. The rule was also applied in the 2022 NFL season, when, prior to a field goal attempt, Chicago Bears holder Trenton Gill attempted to use a towel on the field to create a dry patch during heavy rainfall at Soldier Field. The ensuing 15-yard penalty put the field goal out of the range of kicker Cairo Santos.

In a 2007 interview for an NFL Network segment about the game, Shula recalled protesting the act under Rule 17 (the unfair act clause), which allows the league commissioner to overturn the results of a game if an event extraordinarily outside the realms of accepted practice, such as "non-participant interference," has an effect on the outcome of a game. Commissioner Pete Rozelle responded that, while he agreed wholeheartedly, without a rule explicitly barring such use of the plow, there was nothing he could do. Ron Meyer, who was also interviewed, said that he didn't see why it was such a controversy at the time, saying, "The only thing I could see (the Dolphins) arguing about was 'unfair competitive advantage'." 
The incident is commemorated with an interactive exhibit at the Patriots Hall of Fame within the Patriots' current home, Gillette Stadium. The plow itself, a John Deere Model 314 tractor with sweeper attached, hangs from the ceiling.

See also
 Dolphins–Patriots rivalry
 Tuck Rule Game

References

External links
Snowplow driver won Patriots' fans hearts
Brush with immortality: Tractor driver cleared his way into history

1982 in sports in Massachusetts
1982 National Football League season
American football incidents
December 1982 sports events in the United States
Miami Dolphins
National Football League controversies
National Football League games
New England Patriots
Nicknamed sporting events
Snowplows
Sports competitions in Foxborough, Massachusetts
American football competitions in Massachusetts